Crantock is a coastal civil parish and a village in Cornwall, United Kingdom. The village is approximately two miles (3 km) southwest of Newquay.

Crantock dates back to 460 AD when a group of Irish hermits founded an oratory there. The village lies to the south of the River Gannel which forms a natural boundary between the parishes of Newquay and Crantock. The River Gannel is tidal and  ferries operate on a seasonal basis from Fern Pit to Crantock Beach. The River Gannel runs along Crantock Beach and joins the Atlantic Ocean. The village can be reached from the A3075 road via the junction at Trevemper. The hamlets of Treninnick and West Pentire are in the parish.

Large parts of the parish are now in the ownership of the National Trust, including West Pentire headland which is a Site of Special Scientific Interest noted for its wild flowers and rare plants.

History and antiquities
The older part of the village is situated around its church which is dedicated to St Carantoc, founder of the village. At one time the parish was known as Langurroc which translates as – The Dwelling of Monks. There is a Langurroc Road in the village. Langurroc was infamously (among locals) covered up in a sandstorm and may well lie beneath the sand dunes which back Crantock Beach.

St Carantoc's Church was founded in Norman times and was originally cruciform, but was reconstructed in the 14th and 15th centuries: restoration was carried out during the period 1899–1902 by E. H. Sedding, who died in 1921 and is buried in the churchyard. The font is Norman and the rood screen is much restored. The church was collegiate from ca. 1236 to the Reformation.

Treringey Round near Treninnick is an ancient Iron Age settlement.

Village hall and annual events
The local village hall has recently undergone a transformation, with money from the National Lottery, the awarding of which was featured on ITV's Westcountry Live television programme. The playing field on which the hall is situated was also given a new lease of life and now includes a basketball hoop, climbing facilities, and cricket and football pitches. 

The village hall is now three times larger than it was and was the centrepiece of 2007's annual "Jazz in the Park". The village also hosts a street fair known as the "Crantock Summer Fiesta" which has a coconut shy, tombola, raffle and many other stalls.

In 2006, the village held its second annual "big bale push" involving locals pushing tightly packed straw cylinders around the roads of the village, which are closed for the event. Crantock now holds the Guinness record for bale pushing.The first event raised over £800 and in the ensuing years the total has grown to over £50,000 which has been donated to key charities close to the heart of the local community.

Beaches

Like several other sandy beaches in the Newquay area, Crantock Beach is popular for surfing. There are car parks at Crantock Beach and West Pentire.  The beach is backed by sand dunes.

At the left hand side of the beach, low tide reveals a carving into a rock, showing a picture of a woman's face, and the inscription "Mar not my face but let me be, Secure in this lone cave by the sea, Let the wild waves around me roar, Kissing my lips for evermore". Supposedly, in the early 20th century a woman was horse riding along Crantock Beach. She and her horse were cut off as the tide came in and the rough seas swept them away, drowning them both. Her distraught lover carved a poem into a rock in a cave on the beach, along with a portrait of his lost love and her horse. The carvings are said to be the work of a local man, Joseph Prater.

The coastal footpath skirts all along the west side of the parish. Walking from Crantock the path leads to a sandy cove called Porth Joke, also known as "Polly Joke". Its name comes from the Cornish "porth lojowek" meaning "cove abounding in vegetation". In later Cornish this became Por Lejowak. This cove is entirely surrounded by National Trust land and has been virtually unchanged over the centuries. Further along the coast path is the village of Holywell, with a larger sandy beach at Holywell Bay.

Twinning
 Karanteg, Brittany, France

See also
Places also associated with St Carantoc include:
 St Carantoc's Church, Crantock
 Carhampton, Somerset
 Llangrannog, Ceredigion, Wales
 Carantec, Finistère, Brittany, France

References

 Henderson, Charles (1928) St Carantoc
 Doble, G. H. (1965) The Saints of Cornwall, Part 4. Truro: Dean and Chapter
 Bowen, E. G. (1969) Saints, Seaways and Settlements in the Celtic Lands. Cardiff: University of Wales Press

External links

 DMOZ page for Crantock

Villages in Cornwall
Civil parishes in Cornwall
Populated coastal places in Cornwall
Beaches of Cornwall
Surfing locations in Cornwall